Kazi Firoz Rashid (born 2 February 1947) is a Jatiya Party politician and the current member of parliament for Dhaka-6. He started politics from a very early life, when he was in class nine in school he participated in the movement against Pakistan's the then President General Ayub Khan's education system. During his study at university he was elected vice president twice.

Early life
Rashid was born on 2 February 1947. He completed a B.A., M.A., and a LLB. His father, Kazi Mozaffar Hossain, was the founder of Awami League in Gopalganj.

Career
Rashid was elected to parliament from Dhaka-6 on 5 January 2014 as a candidate of Jatiya Party. In parliament he criticised Prime Minister Sheikh Hasina for making Hasanul Haq Inu a government minister. He is the president of Bangladesh Surfing Association. He served as the president of Bangladesh Cinema Halls Owners Association.

Corruption
On 6 April 2016 Anti-Corruption Commission sued Rashid for grabbing the land of diplomat Mohammed Ali in Dhanmondi in 1979. Rashid appealed against Anti Corruption in the High Court Of Bangladesh and that case is under procedure as of 9 November 2018.

References

Bangladesh Jatiya Party politicians
Living people
11th Jatiya Sangsad members
10th Jatiya Sangsad members
3rd Jatiya Sangsad members
4th Jatiya Sangsad members
1947 births